Phil-Mar van Rensburg (born 23 June 1989) is a South African track and field athlete who specialises in the javelin throw. He was a bronze medallist at the 2015 African Games then became African champion at the 2016 African Championships in Athletics.

International competitions

References

External links

All Athletics profile

Living people
1989 births
South African male javelin throwers
Athletes (track and field) at the 2015 African Games
Athletes (track and field) at the 2018 Commonwealth Games
African Games bronze medalists for South Africa
African Games medalists in athletics (track and field)
White South African people
Commonwealth Games competitors for South Africa